Acatlán  (Nahuatl: acatl for "cane or reed" and tlan for "together or close")  may refer to:

Acatlán, Hidalgo, town
Acatlán, Veracruz
Acatlán Municipality, Veracruz
Acatlán de Juárez, Jalisco
Acatlán de Osorio, Puebla
Acatlán de Pérez Figueroa, Oaxaca 
San Luis Acatlán, Guerrero
Facultad de Estudios Superiores Acatlán at the National Autonomous University of Mexico